Mo Gridder's was a barbecue restaurant and auto repair shop in New York City.

Both the repair shop and BBQ truck are owned by Fred Donnelly. They have received coverage by many magazines and television shows due to the quality of the food and the unusual nature of the business. Mo Gridder's featured on the Hunt's Point episode of Baron Ambrosia's Bronx Flavor and the Food Network's Diners, Drive-Ins, and Dives Season 1, Episode 10.

References

External links

Defunct restaurants in New York City
Hunts Point, Bronx